The following is a list that shows models who have appeared in shoots with Nuts Magazine.

A
 Sophie Alexandra
Kelly Andrews
 Gemma Atkinson

B
 Lacey Banghard
 Sammy Braddy
Cara Brett
 Kelly Brook
 Vikki Blows

C

 Jordan Carver
Kaylee Carver
 Arianny Celeste
Jessica-Jane Clement
 Lucy Collett
Sam Cooke
Katie-Marie Cork

D
 Jess Davies
 Melissa Debling
Katie Downes
Arabella Drummond

F
 Billie Faiers
Sam Faiers
 Joey Fisher
 Emily Free
 Gracie Finlan
 Helen Flanagan
 Emma Frain
Leah Francis

G
 Jodie Gasson
Seren Gibson
 Emma Glover
Alice Goodwin
Imogen Gray
Amy Green
Amii Grove

H
 Holly Hagan
 Kelly Hall
Chanelle Hayes
Keeley Hazell
 Amber Heard
Charlotte Herbert
Sophie Howard
 Beth Humphreys

I

J
 Sabine Jemeljanova
Rosie Jones

K
 Olga Kurylenko
 Emily King

L

 Kitty Lea
 Danielle Lloyd

M
Michelle Marsh
Kerri Marie
Hannah Martin
Stacey Massey
Sarah McDonald
Natasha Mealey
Gemma Merna
 Geena Mullins

N
 Nicole Neal

O
 Nicole L Oakley
 Emily O'Hara
 Natalie Oxley

P

 Roxanne Pallett
Kayleigh Pearson
 Holly Peers
Sammie Pennington
 Lucy Pinder
 Stacey Poole

Q

 Courtnie Quinlan

R
Sophie Reade
India Reynolds
Tanya Robinson

S
 Georgia Salpa
 Danielle Sharp
 Charlotte Springer
 Summer St. Claire
 Lindsey Strutt
Rhian Sugden
April Summers
India Summers

T
 Imogen Thomas
Danica Thrall
Abi Titmuss
Peta Todd

U

V
 Sofia Vergara

W
Daisy Watts
Madison Welch
Jessica Wright
Iga Wyrwal

References

Nuts Magazine